Diana Catarina Ribeiro Gomes (born 26 July 1998) is a Portuguese professional footballer who plays as a centre-back and a midfielder for Spanish Liga F club Sevilla FC and the Portugal women's national team.

Career

Club
Gomes started playing at the local team S.C. Freamunde in Paços de Ferreira in 2012. Four years later, she moved to Campeonato Nacional de Futebol Feminino's team, Valadares Gaia F.C. In 2017, Gomes signed with S.C. Braga.

International
Starting in 2013, Gomes represented Portugal at several youth levels. With the Portugal U17 team, she played the 2014 UEFA Women's Under-17 Championship, the first time the team qualified for a UEFA Women's Under-17 Championship. Gomes also played three 2017 UEFA Women's Under-19 Championship qualifying tournaments for Portugal U19.

On March 3, 2017, Gomes debuted for Portugal senior team in a 6–0 loss for Denmark. On June 19, 2017, she was included by coach Francisco Neto in the 25-women preliminary squad intended to represent Portugal at the UEFA Women's Euro 2017, the first time the Portuguese national team qualified for a women's football major tournament. On July 6, 2017, Neto released the 23-women final roster, cutting Gomes and Cristiana Garcia from the team. However, in the last training session before the departure for the tournament, Jéssica Silva picked up an injury and on July 14, Gomes was called up by Neto as her replacement. Gomes didn't play any match in the competition and Portugal was eliminated in the tournament first stage.

International goals

References

External links
 
 
 
 
 Player's Profile at SC Braga

1998 births
Living people
Portugal women's international footballers
Portuguese women's footballers
Women's association football midfielders
Women's association football defenders
Campeonato Nacional de Futebol Feminino players
S.C. Braga (women's football) players
Valadares Gaia F.C. (women) players
People from Paços de Ferreira
Sportspeople from Porto District
UEFA Women's Euro 2022 players
UEFA Women's Euro 2017 players
Portuguese expatriate women's footballers
Portuguese expatriate sportspeople in Spain
Expatriate women's footballers in Spain
Sevilla FC (women) players